José Berdié Places (1887 – 31 January 1931), sometimes written as Verdié,  was a Spanish footballer who played as a midfielder for Espanyol and FC Barcelona. He won two Copa del Rey titles with the latter.

Club career
Born in Huesca, he joined the first team of Ibèric FC during the 1903-04 season, featuring alongside the likes of Pedro Gibert and Santiago Massana, and they also were teammates at X Sporting Club and RCD Espanyol. He helped the former win the Catalan championship three times in a row between 1906 and 1908. In 1909, the club was effectively relaunched as the Club Deportivo Español, the name which still stands today. He remained loyal to the club until 1911, when his regular good performances drew the attention of FC Barcelona, who signed him in 1911.

He was a member of the legendary Barcelona team of the early 1910s that also included the likes of Francisco Bru, Alfredo Massana, Enrique Peris and Carles Comamala, which won back-to-back Copa del Rey titles in 1912 and 1913. In the latter final, Barcelona needed three games to beat Real Sociedad, and Berdié scored in the third game (2-1) to help the Catalans win the title. He also helped the Catalan club win two Pyrenees Cups titles in 1912 and 1913 and one Catalan Championships in 1912–13. He played for Barcelona until he retired in 1914.

International career
Like many other FC Barcelona players of that time, he played several matches for the Catalan national team in the early 1910s, scoring once. On 24 July 1910, Massana went down in history as one of the eleven footballers who played in Catalonia's first-ever international game (although not recognized by FIFA), which ended in a 1-3 loss to a Paris XI.

Honours

Club
X Sporting Club
Catalan championship:
Champions (3): 1905–06, 1906–07, 1907–08

Barcelona
Catalan championships
Champions (1): 1912–13

Copa del Rey:
Champions (2): 1912 and 1913

Pyrenees Cup:
Champions (2): 1912 and 1913

References

1887 births
1931 deaths
People from La Litera
Sportspeople from the Province of Huesca
Footballers from Aragon
Spanish footballers
Association football midfielders
RCD Espanyol footballers
FC Barcelona players
Catalonia international footballers